The New England Collegiate Conference (NECC) was an NCAA Division II college athletic conference based in the Northeastern United States that dissolved during the late 1990s after most of its members either moved to Division I or joined Division II leagues such as the Northeast-10 Conference or the New York Collegiate Athletic Conference, now known as the East Coast Conference.

The conference was founded in 1981 as the New England College Basketball League, and eventually expanded to sponsor eleven sports: men's and women's soccer, men's and women's volleyball, men's and women's cross country, men's and women's tennis, men's and women's basketball, baseball and softball.

Member schools

Final members

Notes

Other members

Membership timeline

Notable alumni
 Bill Bayno, Sacred Heart, Former UNLV head men's basketball coach
 Manute Bol, Bridgeport, NBA center with Washington Bullets, Golden State Warriors, and Philadelphia 76ers
 Joe Nathan, Stony Brook, Major League Baseball pitcher with San Francisco Giants, Minnesota Twins, and Texas Rangers
 Mike Petke, Southern Connecticut, MLS soccer player with Colorado Rapids, New York/New Jersey Metrostars and D.C. United

References

External links